Stephen Theodore (1883 – 17 October 1950) was a farmer and member of the Queensland Legislative Assembly.

Biography
Theodore was born in Port Adelaide, South Australia, to parents Basil Theodore and his wife Annie (née Tanner). His brother was Ted Theodore, the former Premier of Queensland and Treasurer of Australia. Arriving in Queensland in 1915 after working the goldfields in New South Wales and Western Australia, he was a sugar grower in Tully by 1923 becoming the Director and Chairman of the Tully sugar mill. In 1950 he was a banana farmer in Tully.

In 1900 he married Margaret Wallace (died 1968), and together had four sons and three daughters. Theodore died in October 1950.

Public career
Theodore, for the Labor Party represented the seat of Herbert in the Queensland Legislative Assembly from 1940 until the seat was abolished for the 1950 state election.

Notes

References

Members of the Queensland Legislative Assembly
1883 births
1950 deaths
Australian Labor Party members of the Parliament of Queensland
Australian people of Romanian descent
20th-century Australian politicians
Politicians from Adelaide